Universidad de San Martín de Porres is a women's volleyball club based in Lima, Peru champions of the Peruvian League in 2014 and 2015 and bronze medalists in the 2015 South American Championship. The club takes its name from the private university Universidad de San Martín de Porres.

History

2012
After announcing the retirement of the Universidad de San Martín de Porres football club from the National football National Championship, the club intended to focus in other sports, strengthening the volleyball club among them.

At the end of the 2011–12 season, the team claimed second place in the championship, being defeated by Géminis in the final series. The club's foreign players Cándida Arias and Yonkaira Peña were selected best blocker and spiker, respectively, from the season.

Even when the club Géminis won the league championship and the right to represent Peru in the South American Club Championship, the team refused participating and Universidad San Martin was announced as taking its place in the competition. However, due to the lack of information about the tournament, the team turned back the invitation.

2013
The result of the 2012/2013 season was again the second place for Universidad San Martín after falling to Universidad César Vallejo in the final series. Yonkaira Peña received the season's Best Scorer award for San Martín de Porres.

2014
San Martín de Porres finally claimed their first championship when they defeated 3–1 to Sporting Cristal. Milca Da Silva became the Most Valuable Player and Best Scorer and Zoila La Rosa was awarded Best Setter among the league season's best players.

2015
Having won the league in the previous season, the club claimed a spot in the 2015 South American Club Championship held in February in Osasco, Brazil. USM finished in third place, after losing to the Brazilian Rexona Ades 0–3 in the semifinals, but defeating 3–0 to the Argentinian Atlético Villa Dora in the bronze medal match. USM had Angela Leyva being chosen one of the tournament's Best Outside Hitters.

Yet again, the club representing Universidad de San Martín de Porres won the 2014/2015 Peruvian League season beating 3-1 Deportivo Geminis in the final match.

Current squad
Squad as of the Copa Nacional de Voley Movistar

Technical and managerial staff
Squad as of January, 2019

Honours

Peruvian championships
Liga Nacional Superior de Voleibol: 
 Winners (5): 2013–14, 2014–15, 2015–16, 2017–18, 2018–19
 Runner-up (3): 2011–12, 2012–13, 2016–17

International
Women's South American Volleyball Club Championship: 
 Runner-up (1): 2016

References

Peruvian volleyball clubs
Sport in Lima